The Entolomataceae, also known as Rhodophyllaceae, are a large family of pink-spored terrestrial gilled mushrooms which includes the genera Entoloma,  Rhodocybe, and Clitopilus. The family collectively contains over 1500 species, the large majority of which are in Entoloma.  Genera formerly known as Leptonia and Nolanea, amongst others, have been subsumed into Entoloma.  Mushrooms in the Entolomataceae typically grow in woodlands or grassy areas and have attached gills, differentiating them from the Pluteaceae, which have free gills.

Description
The very large family Entolomataceae has a cosmopolitan distribution, and species are common in both temperate and tropical climates.  Although the shape of the fruiting body and many microscopic characteristics are very diverse, it forms a well-defined group due to the distinctive spores: the spore print is pink (or brownish or greyish pink) and the spores are ornamented with bumps or ridges, or have a sharp-pointed polygonal cross-section.
The spore ornamentation is formed by a unique form of spore-wall thickening, which is called the epicorium.

One notable member is the edible Miller mushroom (Clitopilus prunulus).  Many members of the Entolomataceae are poisonous and most are very obscure and difficult to identify properly.  Examples are the poisonous type species of Entoloma, Entoloma sinuatum, found in Europe and North America, and E. rhodopolium in Europe and Japan.

History and constituent genera
The family Entolomataceae was first defined by the Czech mycologists František Kotlaba and Zdenek Pouzar in 1972.  Although the family as a whole is quite well defined, many different internal classifications of the Entolomataceae have been proposed.  Please see List of Entolomataceae genera for a table of the main genera which have been placed in this family at one time or another.

The current view is that Entolomataceae with angular (polyhedral) spores should be classified in genus Entoloma, those with bumpy spores should be in Rhodocybe, and those with longitudinally ridged spores should be put in Clitopilus.  This makes Entoloma an enormous genus, and in the past attempts have been made to split it up.  In 1871, Paul Kummer created Eccilia, Leptonia and Nolanea to this end at the same time as Entoloma, but DNA studies show these former groups are not natural (they are polyphyletic) and according to modern thinking they should not be accepted.

Furthermore, the study by Co-David et al. indicated Rhodocybe and Clitopilus are not distinguishable as genera and need to be merged.  Since the name Clitopilus has historical precedence, all the Rhodocybe species should in future be moved into Clitopilus.  This paper gives excellent scanning electron micrographs which allow the three-dimensional spore shapes to be understood.

Most surprising are the new genera Rhodocybella, Rhodogaster, and Richoniella, the first being cyphelloid and the other two gasteroid.  They are rare and only contain a few species, but they are of great interest because although their body plans are superficially very different from those of the agarics which constitute the bulk of the family, recent studies have shown they are closely related.  The modern trend is even to move them into the same genera as the related agarics.

Entocybe was circumscribed in 2011 to contain several former Entoloma species having obscurely angular basidiospore with 6–10 angles (some formerly classified as Rhodocybe). In a revised classification of the Rhodocybe-Clitopilus clade, Kluting and colleagues introduced the new genus Clitocella, and resurrected Clitopilopsis and Rhodophana (formerly synonyms of Rhodocybe).

See also
List of Entolomataceae genera
List of Agaricales families

References

External links
 Machiel Noordeloos on Entoloma & Rhodocybe
 The Entolomataceae Family
 Family: Entolomataceae

 
Entolomataceae